The Municipality of Gornja Radgona a municipality in Slovenia. The seat of the municipality is the town of Gornja Radgona.

Settlements
In addition to the municipal seat of Gornja Radgona, the municipality also includes the following settlements:

 Aženski Vrh
 Črešnjevci
 Gornji Ivanjci
 Hercegovščak
 Ivanjski Vrh
 Ivanjševci ob Ščavnici
 Ivanjševski Vrh
 Kunova
 Lastomerci
 Lokavci
 Lomanoše
 Mele
 Negova
 Norički Vrh
 Očeslavci
 Orehovci
 Orehovski Vrh
 Plitvički Vrh
 Podgrad
 Police
 Ptujska Cesta
 Radvenci
 Rodmošci
 Spodnja Ščavnica
 Spodnji Ivanjci
 Stavešinci
 Stavešinski Vrh
 Zagajski Vrh
 Zbigovci

References

External links

 Municipality of Gornja Radgona on Geopedia
 Gornja Radgona municipal site

 
Gornja Radgona
1994 establishments in Slovenia